Donaldson's School, in Linlithgow is Scotland's national residential and day school, providing education, therapy and care for pupils who are deaf or who have communication difficulties.

History

The School's foundation, 1851 
Donaldson's School was founded in 1851 and was housed in the Donaldson's Hospital Building in West Coates, Edinburgh. The school and building were paid for by Sir James Donaldson (1751–1830), who, for a time, was publisher of the Edinburgh Advertiser. The original benefaction was that there should be 200 boys and 200 girls and allowed for special bursaries for poor children. Not all were deaf, although applications on behalf of deaf children were encouraged. From 1938, pupils were exclusively deaf. This benefaction was similar in style to the benefaction of George Watson, who founded and supported other schools in Edinburgh.

In 1938, the Royal Institute for Deaf and Dumb, Edinburgh was merged into Donaldson's School. The Royal Institute for Deaf and Dumb had been founded in 1824 and had been located in Henderson Row, Edinburgh (in a building designed by the architect James Gillespie Graham) and the building then became part of Edinburgh Academy.

Donaldson's Hospital Building, Edinburgh

The 1851 A-listed Donaldson's Hospital building in Edinburgh was designed by architect William Henry Playfair in the Jacobethan inspired by Elizabethan manor houses. The building is built round a quadrangle in Tudor architecture style with large corner towers which themselves are each made up of four smaller towers. Queen Victoria opened the building in 1850 and is reputed to have said that the building was more impressive than many of her own palaces.

After more than 150 years based in the Playfair building, Donaldson's finally concluded that the building was no longer fit for purpose. Many of the rooms were no longer in use, classrooms were unable to use the latest educational technology and the Trust could no longer afford to maintain the building. In 2003 the school's building was put up for sale and was purchased by Scottish property developer Cala Homes for £22 million although the school continued to have use of the building until they moved out in 2008.

In 2015 City and Country, a property developer, submitted plans to develop the Donaldson's Hospital building and the East and West Gatehouses into luxury residential accommodation.  Cala Homes also submitted a plan to build a new crescent of luxury residential accommodation at the rear of the former Donaldson's Hospital building.

Donaldson's School, Linlithgow, 2008

A new, purpose-built Donaldson's campus opened at Preston Road (EH49 6HZ) in Linlithgow in January 2008. The new campus had facilities for up to 120 pupils.

As a national Grant Aided Special School (GASS) supported by the Scottish Government the central location of the new site made the facilities more accessible to pupils from all over Scotland and the north of England.

The new Donaldson's School in Linlithgow was developed in collaboration with staff, pupils, governors, acousticians and architects. It was built with a focus on energy efficiency and the environment.  Shared teaching, sports and dining facilities formed a hub linking two teaching wings the primary and secondary schools. Both schools were grouped around individual play spaces with links and views across the surrounding area. Facilities included a gym, swimming pool, fitness room, dining room, library, and assembly hall as well as an art studio. Classrooms, each of which accommodated six pupils, feature soundfield systems and interactive whiteboards. Donaldson's Lodge (residential accommodation) had 24 rooms placed in a separate building at the edge of the site in Linlithgow.

Donaldson's uses British Sign Language (BSL), Signed Supported English and spoken English, and caters for children and young people from five to 18 years. The curriculum is delivered by an interdisciplinary team of specialist teachers who are supported by specialist learning support assistants and residential care workers, providing round the clock education and care. The team includes: specialist teachers; speech and language therapists; a physiotherapist; and an occupational therapist.

Laura Battles was appointed Principal and chief executive officer of Donaldson's in October 2014. In 2015 she announced that the school had been making losses for several years and that the nursery section of the school would close.

References

External links

 Official page for Donaldson's property developer, City & Country
 Official site for Donaldson's School for children who are deaf or have communications difficulties
 Donaldson's School page on Scottish Schools Online
 Canmore listing for former Edinburgh site

School buildings completed in 1851
Educational institutions established in 1851
Category A listed buildings in Edinburgh
Schools for the deaf in the United Kingdom
Special schools in Scotland
Primary schools in Scotland
Secondary schools in Scotland
1851 establishments in Scotland
World War II prisoner of war camps in Scotland
Schools in West Lothian
Schools in Edinburgh
Clock towers in the United Kingdom